The Sardar Patel Ring Road is a 78 km long ring road encircling the city of Ahmedabad, Gujarat, India. It is a toll road built by the Ahmedabad Urban Development Authority (AUDA). Built at a cost of ₹3.55 billion, it was opened in 2004.

Route 
It meets the Ahmedabad Vadodara Expressway at one point and crosses the Sabarmati River and the Mumbai-Delhi National Highway twice.

The AUDA demarcated a region of 1 km around the road as a residential affordable housing zone in an attempt to improve affordable housing.

Toll 
The road is tolled with several toll plazas at Narol, Ramol, Ranasan and other locations.

Public transport 

The Gujarat State Road Transport Corporation runs a circular bus service along the ring road from Sarkhej on an hourly basis in both directions.

The Shivranjani-Bopal line of the Ahmedabad Janmarg crosses the ring road at Ghuma.

References 

Ring roads in India
Roads in Gujarat
Transport in Ahmedabad
Toll roads in India